Peng Shuai and Zheng Jie were the defending champions but decided not to defend the title together.
Peng chose to play with Sabine Lisicki while Zheng played with Hsieh Su-wei. Both lost in the first round.
Sara Errani and Roberta Vinci won the title by defeating Ekaterina Makarova and Elena Vesnina 6–2, 7–5 in the final.

Seeds
The top four seeds receive a bye into the second round.

Draw

Finals

Top half

Bottom half

References
 Main Draw

Italian Open - Doubles
Women's Doubles